The 2015 Serbia men's EuroBasket team represented Serbia and took the fourth place at the EuroBasket 2015, held in four different countries (Croatia, France, Germany, and Latvia). They were qualified for the EuroBasket by taking the 4th place at the EuroBasket 2013. The team was coached by Aleksandar Đorđević, with assistant coaches Miroslav Nikolić, Milan Minić, Jovica Antonić, and Goran Bjedov.

Timeline
 May 26: 24-man roster announced
 June 24: 18-man roster announced
 July 15: Start of a training camp 
 August 2–29: Exhibition games
 September 5–20: EuroBasket 2013

Roster
The following is the Serbia roster for the EuroBasket 2015

The following were candidates to make the team: 

Notes

Depth chart

Staff 

Source: KSS

Exhibition games

Tournament

Preliminary round

Spain

Germany

Iceland

Turkey

Italy

Knockout stage

Round of 16

Quarterfinals

Semifinals

Third place game

Statistics

References

External links
Official website
EuroBasket 2015 profile

Serbia men's national basketball team by year
EuroBasket 2015
2015–16 in Serbian basketball